At the Black Hawk 3 is a live album by drummer Shelly Manne's group Shelly Manne & His Men, recorded at the Black Hawk in San Francisco, California, in 1959 and released on the Contemporary label. The album was the third volume of four originally released in 1960. In 1991, the albums were re-released on CD with bonus tracks along with a fifth volume of unreleased recordings, and a Complete Live at the Black Hawk box set was released in 2010.

Reception

The AllMusic review by Scott Yanow states: "Considering how much music was documented, it is fortunate that trumpeter Joe Gordon, tenorman Richie Kamuca, pianist Victor Feldman, bassist Monty Budwig and drummer Shelly Manne were in top form for this enjoyable gig. The music is high-quality straightforward and uncomplicated bebop".

Track listing
 "I Am in Love" (Cole Porter) - 12:22
 "Whisper Not" (Benny Golson) - 10:04
 "Black Hawk Blues" (Shelly Manne) - 19:20
 "Whisper Not" [alternate take] (Golson) - 12:25 Bonus track on CD reissue
Recorded at the Black Hawk, San Francisco on September 22 (track 3), September 23 (track 2) and September 24 (tracks 1 & 4), 1959.

Personnel
Shelly Manne - drums
Joe Gordon - trumpet
Richie Kamuca - tenor saxophone
Victor Feldman - piano
Monty Budwig - bass

References

1960 live albums
Contemporary Records live albums
Shelly Manne live albums
Albums recorded at the Black Hawk (nightclub)